Cary Mullen (born 2 October 1969) is a Canadian former alpine skier who competed in the 1992 Winter Olympics and 1994 Winter Olympics.

External links
 sports-reference.com
 

1969 births
Living people
Canadian male alpine skiers
Olympic alpine skiers of Canada
Alpine skiers at the 1992 Winter Olympics
Alpine skiers at the 1994 Winter Olympics
Place of birth missing (living people)